Ljubomir Radanović (Cyrillic: Љубомир Радановић; born 21 July 1960) is a former Yugoslav and Montenegrin footballer who played as a defender.

Club career
After starting out with Lovćen in the Yugoslav Second League, Radanović moved to Yugoslav First League club Partizan in the 1981–82 season. He spent the following seven years at the Stadion JNA, collecting a total of 172 league appearances and scoring 15 goals. After leaving his homeland, Radanović would go on to play for Standard Liège in Belgium, Nice in France, and Bellinzona in Switzerland.

International career
At international level, Radanović earned 34 caps and scored three goals for Yugoslavia between 1983 and 1988. He is best remembered for scoring a dramatic stoppage-time goal to give his country a decisive 3–2 UEFA Euro 1984 qualifier victory over Bulgaria on 21 December 1983. Additionally, Radanović was a member of the Yugoslav team that won the bronze medal at the 1984 Summer Olympics. His final international was an October 1988 FIFA World Cup qualification match away against Scotland.

Statistics

International

International goals
Scores and results list Yugoslavia's goal tally first.

Honours
Partizan
 Yugoslav First League: 1982–83, 1985–86, 1986–87

References

External links
 
 
 
 

1960 births
Living people
Sportspeople from Cetinje
Association football defenders
Yugoslav footballers
Yugoslavia under-21 international footballers
Yugoslavia international footballers
Olympic footballers of Yugoslavia
Footballers at the 1984 Summer Olympics
Olympic bronze medalists for Yugoslavia
UEFA Euro 1984 players
FK Lovćen players
FK Partizan players
Standard Liège players
OGC Nice players
AC Bellinzona players
Montenegrin footballers
Serbia and Montenegro footballers
Serbia and Montenegro expatriate footballers
Yugoslav Second League players
Yugoslav First League players
Belgian Pro League players
Ligue 1 players
Swiss Super League players
Yugoslav expatriate footballers
Expatriate footballers in Belgium
Yugoslav expatriate sportspeople in Belgium
Expatriate footballers in France
Yugoslav expatriate sportspeople in France
Expatriate footballers in Switzerland
Serbia and Montenegro expatriate sportspeople in Switzerland